Kenneth Knighton (born 20 February 1944) is an English former footballer, coach and manager. He is most well known for his spell as manager at Sunderland during which time the club was promoted to the First Division, and he also managed Football League club Orient and non-league clubs Dagenham and Trowbridge Town. As a player, he played as a defender for Wolverhampton Wanderers, Oldham Athletic, Preston North End, Blackburn Rovers, Hull City and Sheffield Wednesday.

Playing career
Knighton was born in Darton. After playing Barnsley schoolboy football and amateur football for Wath Wanderers whilst working as a trainee miner, he joined Wolverhampton Wanderers as a non-contract player in August 1959. He became an apprentice at the club in August 1960 before turning professional in February 1961. He made 16 league appearances for Wolves prior to signing for Oldham Athletic in November 1966 for a fee of £12,000. He joined Preston North End for £35,000 in December 1967 before switching to Blackburn Rovers in July 1969 for £45,000. In 1969, Knighton was asked to tour New Zealand as part of an FA XI. He was sold to Hull City in March 1971 for £60,000 before joining Sheffield Wednesday two years later, where he would retire in January 1976.

Coaching career
Following his retirement as a player, Knighton worked as a youth-team coach at Sheffield Wednesday and a first-team coach at Sunderland before becoming manager in June 1979. Considered a strict disciplinarian during his time as Sunderland manager, he won the club promotion to the First Division as Second Division runners-up in his debut season at the club. He was sacked towards the end of the following season after Tom Cowie took over as chairman. After briefly working as a scout for Manchester United, he became Orient manager in October 1981, but the club were relegated to the Third Division and Knighton was sacked in May 1983 when they struggled in the following season. He later worked as manager of Dagenham and Trowbridge Town.

References

External links
 Ken Knighton's management statistics at Soccerbase
 Ken Knighton at TheStatCat

1944 births
Living people
English footballers
English football managers
People from Darton
Footballers from South Yorkshire
Association football defenders
Wolverhampton Wanderers F.C. players
Oldham Athletic A.F.C. players
Preston North End F.C. players
Blackburn Rovers F.C. players
Hull City A.F.C. players
Sheffield Wednesday F.C. players
English Football League players
Sheffield Wednesday F.C. non-playing staff
Sunderland A.F.C. non-playing staff
Sunderland A.F.C. managers
Manchester United F.C. non-playing staff
Association football coaches